Reece John McFadden (born 1 June 1995) is a Scottish professional boxer. As an amateur, he won bronze medals at both the 2014 and 2018 Commonwealth Games.

Amateur career

Commonwealth Games results
Glasgow 2014
Round of 32: Defeated Andrew Selby (Wales) 3–0
Round of 16: Defeated Charlie Edwards (England) 3–0
Quarter-finals: Defeated Oteng Oteng (Botswana) 3–0
Semi-finals: Defeated by Andrew Moloney 2–1

Gold Coast 2018
Round of 16: Defeated Keevin Allicock (Guyana) 4–1
Quarter-finals: Defeated Syed Muhammad Asif (Pakistan) 5–0
Semi-finals: Defeated by Brendan Irvine (Northern Ireland) 4–1

Professional career 
On 30 November 2018, McFadden made his professional debut against Elvis Guillen of Nicaragua. The fight went the full distance as McFadden won via comfortable points decision. On 22 March 2019, McFadden fought professionally for a second time against Stefan Sashev. He won by a technical knockout after knocking his opponent down midway through the bout before eventually halting Sashev in the final round.

McFadden's third professional fight was against Georgi Georgiev on 18 May 2019 where he secured another comfortable points victory. On 22 June 2019, McFadden maintained his unbeaten record after gaining another points victory by defeating Joel Sanchez.

Professional boxing record

References

External links

1995 births
Living people
Scottish male boxers
Commonwealth Games bronze medallists for Scotland
Boxers at the 2014 Commonwealth Games
Boxers at the 2018 Commonwealth Games
Commonwealth Games medallists in boxing
Sportspeople from North Lanarkshire
Flyweight boxers
Medallists at the 2014 Commonwealth Games
Medallists at the 2018 Commonwealth Games